Danièle Dorléans (born 23 March 1947) is a French former freestyle and medley swimmer. She competed in three events at the 1968 Summer Olympics.

References

External links
 

1947 births
Living people
French female freestyle swimmers
French female medley swimmers
Olympic swimmers of France
Swimmers at the 1968 Summer Olympics
Swimmers from Marseille